Bella Piero is a Brazilian actress, best known for her work in the soap operas, "Verdades Secretas" and "O Outro Lado do Paraíso". On the big screen, she played "Virginia," the protagonist of Caroline Fioratti's film "My Drywall Cocoon," which will have its global première in the SXSW Film Festival in March 2023.

Biography
She started studying theater at the age of seven at CAL, having the stage as the basis of her training, where she worked in about ten plays until she was seventeen. She studied with Roberta Carreri (Odin Teatret), Butoh's workshop with Cecil Gil and Celeste Noah, and in other workshops with Eduardo Milewicz, Lee Strasberg Method with Estrela Straus, among others.

Her last play was David Harrower's Blackbird, directed by Bruce Gomlesvky.

In 2014, Bella did her first audiovisual work, at the Macrossérie, "Verdades Secretas", as Nina, a rebellious teenager, directed by Mauro Mendonça Filho.

In 2015, she was the young protagonist of her first feature, "Ninguém entra Ninguém sai" as "Bebel", directed by Hsu Chein.

In 2016, she appeared in the soap opera "A lei do amor" as the shameless "Xanaia" directed by Denise Saraceni.

Between 2017 and 2018, she appeared in the soap opera "O Outro Lado do Paraíso" as "Laura", a survivor of child sexual abuse. Her acting earned her the Nelson Rodrigues award, for the best approached theme and the best revelation actress award, from Domingão do Faustão 2018. With that, she was invited to be ambassador of the Ela Decide campaign, a UN+ UNFPA BRAZIL initiative.

In 2019, she flimed in the still unpublished film, by filmmaker Arnaldo Jabor, called "Meu último Desejo," where she played "Lu", the Doctor's caregiver, who dreams of being a great actress.

Bella will also portray "Virginia" in Caroline Fioratti's upcoming flim in 2020.

The second season of André Felipe Binder's "Aruanas" on Globoplay features Piero. It is about an activist NGO that looks into pollution problems in the interior of So Paulo, where the main character, "Raquel," resides.

In 2022, she was invited by Greenpeace to visit a community in the Rio Negro Sustainable Development Reserve.

Filmography

Television

Film

Theater

References

External links

1996 births
Living people
Actresses from Rio de Janeiro (city)
Brazilian people of Italian descent
Brazilian telenovela actresses
Brazilian film actresses
Brazilian television actresses
Brazilian stage actresses